In mathematics, a bilinear program is a nonlinear optimization problem whose objective or constraint functions are bilinear. An example is the  pooling problem.

References
 Bilinear program at the Mathematical Programming Glossary.

Mathematical optimization